The phrase "Long Blue Line" may refer to:

Collegiate alumni
 Marietta College, Marietta, Ohio
 United States Air Force Academy, Colorado
 United States Coast Guard Academy, New London, Connecticut

Secondary school alumni
 St. Xavier High School, Cincinnati, Ohio

Other uses
 An episode in season 6 of Cold Case, an American television series

See also
 The Thin Blue Line (disambiguation)
 Blue Line (disambiguation)
 The Long Gray Line